Aaron Thomas Korsh (born November 7, 1966) is an American television producer, writer, and former investment banker.

Works
Korsh wrote for Everybody Loves Raymond, Just Shoot Me!, Love, Inc., Notes from the Underbelly, The Deep End and the USA Network series Suits, of which he is also the creator, and its spin-off Pearson.

References

External links
 

American television producers
American television writers
Place of birth missing (living people)
American male television writers
Living people
Showrunners
1966 births